Buloh Kasap is a state constituency in Johor, Malaysia, that is represented in the Johor State Legislative Assembly.

The state constituency was first contested in 2004 and is mandated to return a single Assemblyman to the Johor State Legislative Assembly under the first-past-the-post voting system. , the State Assemblyman for Buloh Kasap is Zahari Sarip from Barisan Nasional (BN).

Definition 
The Buloh Kasap constituency contains the polling districts of Mensudot Lama, Balai Badang, Balai Badang, Sepang Loi, Mensudot Pindah, Awat, Pekan Gemas Bahru, Gomali, Tambang, Paya Lang, Ladang Sungai Muar, Kuala Paya, Bandar Buloh Kasap Utara, Bandar Buloh Kasap Selatan, Buloh Kasap, Gelang Chinchin and Sepinang.

History

Polling districts 
According to the gazette issued on 33 March 2018, the Buloh Kasap constituency has a total of 17 polling districts.

Representation history

Election results

References 

Johor state constituencies